Chile, la alegría ya viene is a 1988 musical album by various artists released in support of the "No" option during the 1988 Chilean national plebiscite. This album contains the song of the same name, which became the official jingle of the campaign.

Production 
The lyrics of the main song, which were written by Sergio Bravo, were originally written with much darker themes, talking about the murders and disappeared detainees of the military dictatorship, but when Eugenio García, the director of the "No" campaign, gave him the phrase "Chile, joy is coming" as the basis of the song, Bravo began to give meaning to the song with more positive messages. The music was composed by Jaime de Aguirre, who had already composed the music for the song "We are going to win", the eleventh song on the album, in 1987.

The singer of "Chile, joy is coming", Rosa Escobar, worked in the Ministry of Public Works, which at that time was led by General Bruno Siebert. Given this, Escobar commented that this generated a risk in her career: her father, Daniel Escobar, who was part of Salvador Allende's cabinet, was a disappeared detainee.

Track listing 
The album contains the following tracks:

References 

1988 albums
Chilean music
Political music albums by Chilean artists
Protest songs